Mesosa andrewsi is a species of beetle in the family Cerambycidae. It was described by Gressitt in 1942. It is known from Tibet and China.

References

andrewsi
Beetles described in 1942